Peter Freuchen K. Ittinuar (Inuktitut: ᐲᑎᕐ ᐃᑦᑎᓄᐊᕐ; born January 19, 1950) is a Canadian politician. He was the first Inuk in Canada to be elected as an MP, and represented the electoral district of Nunatsiaq in the House of Commons of Canada from 1979 to 1984.

Biography

Early life
Ittinuar, the grandson of Danish explorer, Peter Freuchen, was born in Chesterfield Inlet, Northwest Territories (now Nunavut). He spent part of his youth and adolescence being educated in Ottawa, Ontario, with two childhood friends, Zebedee Nungak and Eric Tagoona.  All three later were important figures in advocating for the rights of the Inuit.  Unbeknownst to them, they had been relocated to Ottawa by federal government authorities, as part of an experiment in cultural assimilation.  These actions and their consequences form the subject of the documentary The Experimental Eskimos (2009).

Political career
Ittinuar was originally elected as a member of the New Democratic Party, but on November 26, 1982, he crossed the floor to sit with the Liberal caucus shortly after Indian Affairs and Northern Development minister John Munro announced plans to improve Inuit self-government by dividing the Northwest Territories into two (see Nunavut).

In 1984 Ittinuar was charged with breach of trust, theft and forgery for allegedly using his parliamentary budget to purchase a boat motor. As a result of the court case he was suspended from the Liberal Party caucus, and he became an independent for the final few months of his term in office. Ittinuar ran for re-election in the 1984 federal election, but was defeated by the Progressive Conservative candidate Thomas Suluk.

Ittinuar was later found not guilty on the 1984 breach of trust, theft and forgery charges.  However, Ittinuar had earlier, in 1979, been convicted of possession of a small amount of cocaine.  In addition, in 1986, he was convicted of assaulting his then wife, Susan Munro, daughter of former Liberal Cabinet Minister John Munro, and was fined.

In 1993, Ittinuar again sought the NDP nomination in Nunatsiaq, but was unable to do so, due to then NDP leader Audrey McLaughlin refusing to endorse his candidacy.

In 2008, while living in southern Ontario, Ittinuar ran unsuccessfully for the Green Party in the Nunavut riding in the federal election.  He had previously sought and lost the Green Party nomination in the southern Ontario riding of Brant.

Electoral record

References

External links
 Ittinuar at Collections Canada
 

1950 births
Inuit from the Northwest Territories
Canadian people of Danish descent
Inuit politicians
Liberal Party of Canada MPs
Living people
Members of the House of Commons of Canada from the Northwest Territories
New Democratic Party MPs
People from Chesterfield Inlet
Green Party of Canada candidates in the 2008 Canadian federal election
Independent MPs in the Canadian House of Commons
Indigenous Members of the House of Commons of Canada
Canadian politicians convicted of crimes
Inuit from Nunavut
Nunavut candidates for Member of Parliament